Lynzee Klingman is an American film editor known for her work on films like One Flew Over the Cuckoo's Nest (for which she was nominated for an Oscar, along with Richard Chew and Sheldon Kahn) and A River Runs Through It. She has also taught editing at the University of Southern California.

Selected filmography 

 The Beaver (2011)
 Flakes (2007)
 The Lake House (2006)
 Down in the Valley (2005)
 Duplex (2003)
 Ali (2001)
 Panic (2000)
 Man on the Moon (1999)
 Living Out Loud (1998)
 City of Angels (1998)
 Hush (1998)
 Matilda (1996)
 Home for the Holidays (1995)
 Outbreak (1995)
 Picture Bride (1994)
 Hoffa (1992)
 A River Runs Through It (1992)
 Little Man Tate (1991)
 The War of the Roses (1989)
 Baby Boom (1987)
 Maxie (1985)
 True Confessions (1981)
 Gilda Live (1980)
 Hair (1979)
 Almost Summer (1978)
 You Light Up My Life (1977)
 One Flew Over the Cuckoo's Nest (1975)
 Hearts and Minds (1974)

References

External links

American women film editors
American film editors
1943 births
BAFTA winners (people)
Living people
University of Wisconsin–Madison alumni
Columbia University alumni
University of Southern California faculty
21st-century American women